Mirador is a compilation album by the English rock band Magnum. It was released in 1987 by FM Records.

Released before FM Records released Magnum's back catalogue, this compilation contains material from the albums Kingdom of Madness, Magnum II, Chase the Dragon, The Eleventh Hour and On a Storyteller's Night.

Track listing

Cover sleeve
The cover art was designed by Rodney Matthews.

Personnel
Tony Clarkin — guitar
Bob Catley — vocals
Wally Lowe — bass guitar
Richard Bailey — keyboards, flute
Kex Gorin — drums
Mark Stanway — keyboards
Jim Simpson — drums

References

External links
 www.magnumonline.co.uk — Official Magnum site
 Record covers — at rodneymatthews.com

Albums produced by Leo Lyons
Albums produced by Tony Clarkin
Magnum (band) compilation albums
1987 compilation albums
Albums with cover art by Rodney Matthews
Albums produced by Jeff Glixman